The 2016–17 Austin Peay Governors basketball team represented Austin Peay State University during the 2016–17 NCAA Division I men's basketball season. The Governors, led by 27th-year head coach Dave Loos, played their home games at the Dunn Center in Clarksville, Tennessee and were members of the West Division of the Ohio Valley Conference. They finished the season 11–19, 7–9 in conference play to finish in fourth place in the West Division. They failed to qualify for the Ohio Valley Conference tournament.

On March 2, 2017, head coach Dave Loos announced his retirement. He had been undergoing cancer treatment during the season, and had taken a medical leave in January 2017, missing four games. He finished with a 27 year record of 420–410. On April 3, South Carolina assistant Matt Figger was hired as the new head coach of APSU.

Previous season 
The Governors finished the 2015–16 season with a record of 18–18, 8–9 in Ohio Valley Conference play. They defeated Tennessee Tech, Tennessee State, Belmont and UT Martin to win the conference tournament as the No. 8 seed. As a result, they received the conference's automatic bid to the NCAA tournament. As a No. 16 seed in the Tournament, they lost to Kansas in the first round.

Preseason 
In a vote of Ohio Valley Conference head men’s basketball coaches and sports information directors, Austin Peay was picked to finish third in the West Division of the conference.

Roster

Schedule

|-
!colspan=9 style=| Exhibition

|-
!colspan=9 style=| Non-conference regular Season

|-
!colspan=9 style=| Ohio Valley Conference regular season

References

Austin Peay Governors men's basketball seasons
Austin Peay
Austin Peay
Austin Peay